Vaccination policy in the United States is the subset of U.S. health policy that deals with immunization against infectious disease. It is decided at various levels of the government, including the individual states. This policy has been developed over the approximately two centuries since the invention of vaccination with the purpose of eradicating disease from the U.S. population, or creating a herd immunity. Policies intended to encourage vaccination impact numerous areas of law, including regulation of vaccine safety, funding of vaccination programs, vaccine mandates, adverse event reporting requirements, and compensation for injuries asserted to be associated with vaccination.

Regulation of vaccine safety
The United States Food and Drug Administration has the authority to enforce the safety of vaccines. The FDA requires that all new vaccines first be tested in laboratory settings and on animals, and must then carry out a series of increasingly stringent tests in human subjects. Once vaccines are introduced to the market, the FDA regularly inspects their production facilities, tests their quality, and receives reports of adverse reactions.

In the 2012 case of Coalition for Mercury-Free Drugs v. Sebelius, the United States Court of Appeals for the District of Columbia Circuit held that opponents of thimerosal-preserved vaccines lacked standing to challenge determinations by the Food and Drug Administration that the vaccines and their components were safe and effective. In the opinion, judge Brett M. Kavanaugh (joined by Judith W. Rogers and Stephen F. Williams) therefore rejected the challenge on standing grounds. The court further found it irrelevant that thimerosal was included in some versions of mandated vaccines, because it was possible for those seeking to avoid the ingredient to receive thimerosal-free vaccines.

Vaccination schedule and mandates
The Advisory Committee on Immunization Practices makes scientific recommendations which are generally followed by the federal government, state governments, and private health insurance companies, including making recommendations for the vaccination schedule used in the United States.

The American Academy of Pediatrics (AAP) advises physicians to respect the refusal of parents to vaccinate their child after adequate discussion, unless the child is put at significant risk of harm (e.g., during an epidemic, or after a deep and contaminated puncture wound). Under such circumstances, the AAP states that parental refusal of immunization constitutes a form of medical neglect and should be reported to state child protective services agencies.

All vaccines recommended by the U.S. government for its citizens are required for green card applicants. This requirement stirred controversy when it was applied to the HPV vaccine in July 2008 due to the cost of the vaccine. In addition, the other thirteen required vaccines prevent highly contagious diseases communicable through the respiratory route, while HPV is spread only through sexual contact. In November 2009, this requirement was canceled.

Though the federal guidelines do not require written consent in order to receive a vaccination, they do require doctors give the recipients or legal representatives a Vaccine Information Statement (VIS). Specific informed consent laws are made by the states. Several states allow minors to legally consent to vaccination over parental objections under the mature minor doctrine. Socioeconomic disparities have been found to hinder reasonable access to vaccinations in the U.S., and it has also been found that even were such status is not a factor, "racial ethnic minority adults are less likely than whites to receive preventive care including vaccination".

School children

History of school vaccination requirements
The United States has a long history of school vaccination requirements. The first school vaccination requirement was enacted in the 1850s in Massachusetts to prevent the spread of smallpox. The school vaccination requirement was put in place after the compulsory school attendance law caused a rapid increase in the number of children in public schools, increasing the risk of smallpox outbreaks. The early movement towards school vaccination laws began at the local level including counties, cities, and boards of education. By 1827, Boston had become the first city to mandate that all children entering public schools show proof of vaccination. In addition, in 1855 the Commonwealth of Massachusetts had established its own statewide vaccination requirements for all students entering school, this influenced other states to implement similar statewide vaccination laws in schools as seen in New York in 1862, Connecticut in 1872, Pennsylvania in 1895, and later the Midwest, South and Western US. By 1963, twenty states had school vaccination laws.

These vaccination laws resulted in political debates throughout the United States as those opposed to vaccination sought to repeal local policies and state laws. An example of this political controversy occurred in 1893 in Chicago, where less than ten percent of the children were vaccinated despite the twelve year old state law. Resistance was seen at the local level of the school district as some local school boards and superintendents opposed the state vaccination laws, leading the state board health inspectors to examine vaccination policies in schools. Resistance proceeded during the mid-1900s and in 1977 a nationwide Childhood Immunization Initiative was developed with the goal of increasing vaccination rates among children to 90% by 1979. During the two-year period of observation, the initiative reviewed the immunization records of more than 28 million children and vaccinated children who had not received the recommended vaccines.

In 1922, the constitutionality of childhood vaccination was examined in the Supreme Court case Zucht v. King. The court ruled that a school could deny admission to children who failed to provide a certification of vaccination for the protection of the public health. In 1987, a measles epidemic occurred in Maricopa County, Arizona and another court case, Maricopa County Health Department vs. Harmon, examined the arguments of an individual's right to education over the states need to protect against the spread of disease. The court found it prudent to take action to combat the spread of disease by denying un-vaccinated children a place in school until the risk for the spread of measles had passed. The Supreme Court has not since decided a vaccination mandate case, but noted in a subsequent case, Prince v. Massachusetts, that the state had power over certain activities of children, including requiring that they be vaccinated. The court in Prince said:

California's abolition of all non-medical exemptions for school entrance was upheld by the courts in 2018; a California appellate court rejected an anti-vaccination group's claims that the mandatory-vaccination law violated the right to due process, right to privacy, right to a public education, and right to free exercise of religion under the California Constitution.

Current requirements and exemptions
All fifty states in the U.S. mandate immunizations for children in order to enroll in public school, but the specific vaccines required differ from state to state, and various exemptions are available depending on state law.

All states have exemptions for people who have medical contraindications to vaccines. , 44 states and the District of Columbia grant exemptions for people who have religious objections to immunizations. The six states that do not recognize a religious objection are California (California Senate Bill 277), Connecticut, Maine (2020 Maine Question 1), Mississippi, New York, and West Virginia. Until 2019, only Mississippi, West Virginia and California did not permit religious exemptions. However, the 2019 measles outbreak led to the repeal of religious exemptions in the state of New York and for the MMR vaccination in the state of Washington.
 
, 15 states allow parents to cite personal, conscientious, philosophical, or other objections. Beginning in the 2000s, an increasing number of parents, invoking religious and philosophical exemptions, did not allow their children to receive vaccinations. Research establishes a link between the rise of vaccine-preventable diseases and non-medical exemptions from school vaccination requirements, with the increased use of such exemptions contributing to loss of herd immunity within high-vaccine refusal communities ("clusters"), and hence an increasing number of infectious disease outbreaks, including measles outbreaks in 2018 and 2019. "Exemption clustering" has been identified as a collective action threat to public health.

Immunization information systems (IIS) are complex in the U.S., and the convoluted network of public health, medical, and education system data impedes the sharing of data on student vaccination histories. A 2014 study of the 50 states, the District of Columbia, and five cities founded that, as of 2010, about 79% of these systems required "schools or child-care facilities to report immunizations to local education or public health departments or allow them access to their records" and required provision of this information for children to attend school or for a child-care facility to receive and maintain its license. The study found, however, that only 11% of systems required that schools or child-care facilities coordinate with IIS. The study found that five factors complicated compliance with policies on maintaining records on proof of immunization: "a complex and changing recommended immunization schedule, duplication of record-keeping efforts, conflict and confusion between health record and education record policies, no or limited school access to IIS, and fear of penalties for violating privacy policies."

States generally set policy on vaccinations required for school enrollment/attendance, including exemptions; while the possibility of individual school districts setting out their own vaccine requirements has been discussed, no school district has done so.

Health care workers
Most states have some kind of requirement that at least some kinds of health care workers receive certain vaccinations to protect their patients, e.g. influenza, measles, hepatitisB (potential exposure to blood) and rubella (potential contact with pregnant women).

Military personnel

Immunizations are often compulsory for military enlistment in the U.S. The United States has a very complex history with compulsory vaccination, particularly in enforcing it both domestically and abroad to protect American soldiers during times of war. There are hundreds of thousands of examples of soldier deaths not from combat wounds but disease. During the American Revolutionary War, General George Washington required American soldiers to undergo variolation for smallpox out of concern that the British, who had long practiced it in their own military, would be able to use smallpox as a weapon against the Continental Army. Among wars with high death tolls from disease is the Civil War where an estimated 224,000 soldiers died from all diseases combined. American soldiers in other countries have spread diseases that ultimately disrupted entire societies and healthcare systems with famine and poverty.

Spanish–American War
The Spanish–American War began in April 1898 and ended in August 1898. During this time the United States gained control of Cuba, Puerto Rico, and the Philippines from Spain. As a military police power and as colonizers the United States took a very hands-on approach in administering healthcare particularly vaccinations to natives during the invasion and conquest of these countries. Although the Spanish–American War occurred during the era of "bacteriological revolution" where knowledge of disease was bolstered by germ theory, more than half of the soldier casualties in this war were from disease. Unknowingly, American soldiers acted as agents of disease transmission, fostering bacteria in their haphazardly made camps. These soldiers invaded Cuba, Puerto Rico, and the Philippines and connected parts of these countries that had never before been connected due to the countries sparse nature thereby beginning epidemics. The mobility of American soldiers around these countries encouraged a newfound mobility of disease that quickly infected natives.

Military personnel used Rudyard's Kipling's poem "The White Man's Burden" to explain their imperialistic actions in Cuba, the Philippines, and Puerto Rico and the need for the United States to help the "dark-skinned Barbarians" reach modern sanitary standards. American actions abroad before, during, and after the war emphasized a need for proper sanitation habits especially on behalf of the natives. Natives who refuse to oblige with American health standards and procedures risked fines or imprisonment. One penalty in Puerto Rico included a $10 fine for a failure to vaccinate and an additional $5 fine for any day you continue to be unvaccinated, refusal to pay resulted in ten or more days of imprisonment. If entire villages refused the army's current sanitation policy at any given time they risked being burnt to the ground in order to preserve the health and safety of soldiers from endemic smallpox and yellow fever. Vaccines were forcibly administered to the Puerto Ricans, Cubans, and Filipinos. Military personnel in Puerto Rico provided Public Health services that culminated in military orders mandating vaccinations for children before they were six months old, as well as a general vaccination order. By the end of 1899 in Puerto Rico alone the U.S. military and other hired native vaccinators called practicantes, vaccinated an estimated 860,000 natives in a five-month period. This period began the United States' movement toward an expansion of medical practices that included "tropical medicine" in an attempt to protect the lives of soldiers abroad.

Adverse event reporting
There are several programs for monitoring the safety of vaccines in the United States. Chief among these is the Vaccine Adverse Event Reporting System (VAERS), which is co-managed by the U.S. Centers for Disease Control and Prevention (CDC) and the Food and Drug Administration (FDA). VAERS is a postmarketing surveillance program, collecting information about adverse events (possible harmful side effects) that occur after administration of vaccines to ascertain whether the risk–benefit ratio is high enough to justify continued use of any particular vaccine. In addition to VAERS, the Vaccine Safety Datalink, and the Clinical Immunization Safety Assessment (CISA) Network are tools by which the CDC and FDA measure vaccine safety.

Vaccine injury compensation
The National Vaccine Injury Compensation Program (VICP or NVICP) was established pursuant to the 1986 National Childhood Vaccine Injury Act (NCVIA), passed by the United States Congress in response to a threat to the vaccine supply due to a 1980s scare over the DPT vaccine. Despite the belief of most public health officials that claims of side effects were unfounded, large jury awards had been given to some plaintiffs, most DPT vaccine makers had ceased production, and officials feared the loss of herd immunity. The U.S. Department of Health and Human Services set up the National Vaccine Injury Compensation Program (VICP) in 1988 to compensate individuals and families of individuals injured by covered childhood vaccines.

The Office of Special Masters of the U.S. Court of Federal Claims, popularly known as "vaccine court", administers a no-fault system for litigating vaccine injury claims. These claims against vaccine manufacturers cannot normally be filed in state or federal civil courts, but instead must be heard in the U.S. Court of Federal Claims, sitting without a jury. Compensation covers medical and legal expenses, loss of future earning capacity, and up to $250,000 for pain and suffering; a death benefit of up to $250,000 is available. If certain minimal requirements are met, legal expenses are compensated even for unsuccessful claims. Since 1988, the program has been funded by an excise tax of 75 cents on every purchased dose of covered vaccine. To win an award, a claimant must have experienced an injury that is named as a vaccine injury in a table included in the law within the required time period or show a causal connection. The burden of proof is the civil law preponderance-of-the-evidence standard, in other words a showing that causation was more likely than not. Denied claims can be pursued in civil courts, though this is rare.

The VICP covers all vaccines listed on the Vaccine Injury Table maintained by the Secretary of Health and Human Services; in 2007 the list included vaccines against diphtheria, tetanus, pertussis (whooping cough), measles, mumps, rubella (German measles), polio, hepatitis B, varicella (chicken pox), Haemophilus influenzae type b, rotavirus, and pneumonia. From 1988 until 8January 2008, 5,263 claims relating to autism, and 2,865 non-autism claims, were made to the VICP. 925 of these claims, one autism-related (see previous rulings), were compensated, with 1,158 non-autism and 350 autism claims dismissed; awards (including attorney's fees) totaled $847million. As of October 2019, $4.2billion in compensation (not including attorneys fees and costs) has been awarded over the forty-three year history of the program.

See also

 Albert Sabin
 Comparison of the healthcare systems in Canada and the United States
 Health care in the United States
 Health care prices in the United States
 Health in the United States
 Health insurance in the United States
 Health Insurance Portability and Accountability Act (HIPAA)
 History of health care reform in the United States
 History of medicine in the United States
 Jonas Salk
 List of epidemics and pandemics
 List of vaccine topics
 Maurice Hilleman
 1918 influenza pandemic
 Polio vaccine
 Public policy of the United States
 Race and health in the United States
 United States Preventive Services Task Force
 Vaccine hesitancy
 Vaccination policy
 Vaccination schedule

References

Policy, Vaccination, United States
Pharmaceuticals policy